Amesbury railway station was a station in the county of Wiltshire in southern England. It was located on the Bulford Camp branch line, which diverged from what is now known as the West of England Main Line at a triangular junction between Grateley and Idmiston Halt. When it was open, Amesbury was the nearest station to Stonehenge and carried a lot of traffic to the military areas in and around Salisbury Plain, particularly during the Second World War in the preparations for D-Day.

History
Opened on 2 June 1902 by the Amesbury and Military Camp Light Railway, and becoming part of the London and South Western Railway, the station was absorbed by the Southern Railway during the Grouping of 1923. It then passed on to the Southern Region of British Railways on nationalisation in 1948. Passenger services were withdrawn in 1952 but goods trains and occasional military special trains used the station until 1963.

References

External links
 Pictures of the station
 First World War picture of the station
 Station on navigable O.S. map

Disused railway stations in Wiltshire
Former London and South Western Railway stations
Railway stations in Great Britain opened in 1902
Railway stations in Great Britain closed in 1952
Amesbury